FabricLive.31 is a DJ mix compilation album by The Glimmers, as part of the FabricLive Mix Series.

Track listing
  Roxy Music - Same Old Scene (Glimmers Remix) - Virgin
  Fingerprintz - Wet Job - Virgin
  The League Unlimited Orchestra - Things That Dreams Are Made Of (Instrumental Remix) - EMI
  Pop Dell' Arte - No Way Back - Different
  The Glimmers - Kobe's In Columbia - Diskimo
  Prins Thomas vs. Blackbelt Andersen - En Real Tjukkas - Trailerpark
  The Holy Ghost - The World (The Dub) - Holy Ghost Inc
  Sons and Daughters - Dance Me In (JD Twitch and The Truffle Club's Optimo Remix) - Domino
  Neal Howard - The Gathering - Neal Howard
  Freddie Mercury - Love Kills (More Oder ReWork By The Glimmers) - EMI
  Mekon - Boy Bitten featuring Rita Brown (Padded Cell Remix) - Wall Of Sound/PIAS
  Freeez - I.O.U. (I.Dub.U.) - Beggars Banquet
  Chris "The Glove" Taylor & David Storrs - Reckless - Universal
  George Kranz - Din Daa Daa - George Kranz
  LCD Soundsystem - Disco Infiltrator - DFA
  Urban Jungle - Bad Man (Black Dog Bite Mix) - Virgin
  Black Slate - Sticks Man - CNR
  Urban Jungle - Bad Man (Black Dog Bite Mix) - Virgin
  Howie B - My Speedboat Is Faster Than Yours - Pussyfoot
  Pierre Henry - Too Fortiche - Mercury
  Arpadys - Monkey Star - Music Code

External links
Fabric: FabricLive.31

Fabric (club) albums
2006 compilation albums